SS San Jacinto (ID-2586) was an American commercial passenger-cargo ship chartered by the United States Army for World War I service and considered for acquisition by the United States Navy as USS San Jacinto (ID-1531).

San Jacinto was built by Delaware River Iron Ship Building and Engine Works in 1903 at Chester, Pennsylvania for the Mallory Line. During the period the United States participated in World War I, she served under U.S. Army charter.  Although the U.S. Navy considered acquiring San Jacinto and even assigned her the naval registry Identification Number (Id. No.) 1531, the Navy never took control of her, and she remained under Army control through the end of the war.

On either 9 July, 10 July, or 11 July 1918 San Jacinto collided with the U.S. Navy cargo ship USS Oosterdijk (ID-2586) in the North Atlantic Ocean. Both ships were seriously damaged and forced to turn about to steam for the nearest port. Despite the efforts of her crew to save her, Oosterdijk had to be abandoned on either 10 July 1918 or 11 July 1918 and sank at 15:30 hours that afternoon. San Jacinto carried Oosterdijks crew members to Halifax, Nova Scotia, Canada.

San Jacinto was repaired and returned to service under Army charter for the remainder of the war.

THe original yard-built 27.5-41.5-70 by 42in 635nhp engines are replaced by two 23-39-66 by 42in 564nhp Hooven-Owens-Rentschler engines at a cost of $100,000 during a general overhaul at Tietjen & Lang, New Jersey in December 1921.

Sinking
On 21 April 1942 the San Jacinto was sighted by the German submarine U-201. On 22 April 1942, after around twelve hours of pursuit, U-201 fired a 
torpedo that struck the unarmed and unescorted ship at 03.29 hours. Of the eight officers, seventy-one crewmen, and one hundred-four passengers, fourteen were killed. The survivors, including 32 women and children, tied their life-rafts together and waited until daylight to radio for help. They were picked up by USS Rowan (DD-405).

Notes

References
Department of the Navy: Naval Historical Center Online Library of Selected Images: Civilian Ships: San Jacinto (American Freighter, 1903) 
NavSource Online: Section Patrol Craft Photo Archive: San Jacinto (ID 1531)
 for USS Oosterdijk (ID-2586)
Department of the Navy: Naval Historical Center Online Library of Selected Images:  U.S. Navy Ships: USS Oosterdijk (ID # 2586), 1918. Originally S.S. Oosterdijk (1913) 
NavSource Online: Section Patrol Craft Photo Archive: Oosterdijk (ID 2586)

World War I merchant ships of the United States
Cancelled ships of the United States Navy
1903 ships
Maritime incidents in 1918
Maritime incidents in April 1942
Ships built by the Delaware River Iron Ship Building and Engine Works
Ships sunk by German submarines in World War II
World War II shipwrecks in the Atlantic Ocean